St Francis of Assisi Church is a Roman Catholic Parish church in Birmingham. While the church is located between the Lozells and Hockley parts of the city, the parish covers most of Handsworth. It was founded in 1840, originally as a chapel in the nearby listed building, St. Mary's Convent designed by Augustus Pugin.

History

Convent of Our Lady of Mercy
In 1840, Nicholas Wiseman, as coadjutor bishop of Thomas Walsh, the Vicar Apostolic of the Midland District, invited the Sisters of Mercy to Birmingham. The sisters set up a convent on a piece of land given to them by John Hardman of Hardman & Co. who lived opposite. He promised to bear all the expenses of creating a convent, and helped by an endowment of £2000 from the Earl of Shrewsbury he commissioned Augustus Pugin to design the building for them. The chapel of the convent, dedicated to Saint Mary served as the parish church until 1847.

St Mary's Church
In 1845, with the local Catholic population increasing, it was decided that a larger church would have to be built. So building work started on a separate church that was located next door to the convent. In July 1847, St Mary's Church was opened and consecrated by Bishop William Wareing. In 1882, a new priest, Fr Francis Hopkins joined the parish. He saw that the new church could not accommodate the increasingly numerous congregation, so he made it his priority to start the construction of a new church.

St Francis of Assisi Church
Land for the new church was bought from the Hardman family opposite the convent and the Hardman family house became the presbytery of the new church. The architect chosen to design the church was Canon Alexander Scoles. He was a priest from the Diocese of Clifton and came from a family of architects. His father was Joseph John Scoles, who designed the Church of the Immaculate Conception in Farm Street, London and his brother was Ignatius Scoles who designed St Wilfrid's Church in Preston, Lancashire. Four years later, Canon Scoles went on to design Our Lady of Loreto and St Winefride's Church in Kew, London.

The foundation stone of St Francis' church was laid in May 1893 by Bishop Edward Ilsley. The church was completed a year later and was opened by Cardinal Herbert Vaughan on 2 February 1894. When the debt from the cost of the building, £9000 was paid off five years later, the church was consecrated on 21 June 1900.

Interior
With the Hardman family being so prominent in the founding and construction of the church, it is unsurprising that a lot of the interior work was done by Hardman & Co. All of the stained glass windows were made by the company. One window depicting the Annunciation  adjacent to the Lady chapel was designed by William John Wainwright and then built by Hardman & Co. The altar and reredos was made from a drawing done by the architect, Alexander Scoles.

Parish
Next door to the church is the St Francis Centre, it is social centre that was built in 1909 by the then parish priest, Monsignor John O'Hanlon. It houses a large hall, a stage, kitchen and offices.

The church was refurbished in the 1980s by Monsignor Thomas Fallon.  It meant that the sanctuary was changed, bringing it in line with the decrees of the Second Vatican Council.

The church has five Masses for Sundays. There's a Mass at 7pm on Saturday evening, 9:30 and 11:30 on Sunday morning, a Vietnamese language Mass at 1:30pm and a Sunday evening Mass at 6.30pm. The church also has weekday morning Masses at 9:15am. There is an adoration chapel next door to the church that can also be used for prayer.

The site of the old St Mary's church is now occupied by St Francis Catholic Primary School. The school has a close relationship with the parish and the Sisters of Mercy next door who each have a representative on the school's board of governors.

As well as the Sisters of Mercy, other Catholic religious orders also work in the parish. The Missionary Sisters of St. Columban, the Missionary Sisters Servants of the Holy Spirit, the Missionaries of Charity and the Dominican Sisters of St Rose of Lima all help pastorally in the area with the congregation.

Exterior

See also
 Lozells
 Handsworth
 Archdiocese of Birmingham

References

Roman Catholic churches in Birmingham, West Midlands
1840 establishments in England
Roman Catholic churches completed in 1894
Gothic Revival church buildings in England
Gothic Revival architecture in the West Midlands (county)
Saint Francis
19th-century Roman Catholic church buildings in the United Kingdom